The Purine Nucleotide Cycle is a metabolic pathway in protein metabolism requiring the amino acids aspartate and glutamate. The cycle is used to regulate the levels of adenine nucleotides, in which ammonia and fumarate are generated. AMP coverts into IMP and the byproduct ammonia.  IMP converts to S-AMP (adenylosuccinate), which then coverts to AMP and the byproduct fumarate. The fumarate goes on to produce ATP (energy) via oxidative phosphorylation as it enters the Krebs Cycle and then the Electron Transport Chain. Lowenstein first described this pathway and outlined its importance in processes including amino acid catabolism and regulation of flux through glycolysis and the Krebs cycle. 

AMP produced from adenine and adenosine are the most direct pathways; however, AMP can be produced through less direct metabolic pathways, such as de novo synthesis of IMP or through salvage pathways of guanine (a purine) and any of the purine nucleotides and nucleosides. IMP is synthesized de novo from glucose through the Pentose Phosphate Pathway which produces Ribose 5-P, which then converts to PRPP that with the amino acids glycine, glutamine, and aspartate (see Purine Metabolism) can be further converted into IMP. AMP is also produced after strenuous muscle contraction when the ATP reservoir is low (ADP > ATP) by the adenylate kinase (myokinase) reaction.

Reactions
The cycle comprises three enzyme-catalysed reactions. The first stage is the deamination of the purine nucleotide adenosine monophosphate (AMP) to form inosine monophosphate (IMP), catalysed by the enzyme AMP deaminase:

AMP + H2O → IMP + NH4+

The second stage is the formation of adenylosuccinate from IMP and the amino acid aspartate, which is coupled to the energetically favourable hydrolysis of GTP, and catalysed by the enzyme adenylosuccinate synthetase:

Aspartate + IMP + GTP → Adenylosuccinate + GDP + Pi

Finally, adenylosuccinate is cleaved by the enzyme adenylosuccinate lyase to release fumarate and regenerate the starting material of AMP:

Adenylosuccinate → AMP + Fumarate

A recent study showed that activation of HIF-1α allows cardiomyocytes to sustain mitochondrial membrane potential during anoxic stress by utilizing fumarate produced by adenylosuccinate lyase as an alternate terminal electron acceptor in place of oxygen. This mechanism should help provide protection in the ischemic heart.

Occurrence
The Purine Nucleotide Cycle occurs in the cytosol (a gel-like substance) of the sarcoplasm of skeletal muscle, and in the myocyte's cytosolic compartment of the cytoplasm of cardiac and smooth muscle. The cycle occurs when ATP reservoirs run low (ADP > ATP), such as strenuous exercise, fasting or starvation.  

Proteins catabolize into amino acids, and amino acids are precursors for purines, nucleotides and nucleosides which are used in the Purine Nucleotide Cycle. The amino acid glutamate is used to neutralize the ammonia produced when AMP is converted into IMP. Another amino acid, aspartate, is used along with IMP to produce S-AMP in the cycle. "Muscle has an available supply of amino acids for use in catabolism, and these comprise what is known as the free amino acid pool. However, continued muscle contraction, especially when carbohydrate supply and/or provision is inadequate, requires protein catabolism to sustain free amino acids."

When the Phosphagen System (ATP-PCr) has been depleted of phosphocreatine (creatine phosphate), the Purine Nucleotide Cycle also helps to sustain the myokinase reaction by reducing accumulation of AMP produced after muscle contraction in the bellow reaction. 

During muscle contraction: 
 ATP → ADP + Pi (utilization of ATP for Muscle contraction by ATPase)
 ADP + CP → ATP + Creatine (catalyzed by creatine kinase, ATP is used again in the above reaction for continued muscle contraction)
 2 ADP → ATP + AMP (catalyzed by adenylate kinase/myokinase when CP is depleted, ATP is again used for muscle contraction)  
Muscle at rest:
 ATP + Creatine → ADP + CP (catalyzed by creatine kinase)
 ADP + Pi → ATP (during anaerobic glycolysis and oxidative phosphorylation)
AMP can dephosphorylate to adenosine and diffuse out of the cell; the Purine Nucleotide Cycle may therefore also reduce the loss of adenosine from the cell since nucleosides permeate cell membranes, whereas nucleotides do not.

Consequences

Fumarate synthesis 
Fumarate is an intermediate of TCA cycle and enters the mitochondria by converting into malate and utilising the malate shuttle where it is converted into Oxaloacetic acid (OAA). OAA either enters into TCA cycle or converts into aspartate in the mitochondria. Aspartate can re-enter purine nucleotide cycle.
Oxaloacetic acid + Glutamate ↔ α-Ketoglutarate + Aspartate (catalysed by aspartate aminotransferase)

Ammonia synthesis  (ammonia genesis) 
The glutamate produced by OAA as above gains an NH3 to become a Glutamine and enters the circulation to reach kidneys. In kidneys, glutamine is deaminated twice to form glutamate and then α-ketoglutarate. These NH3 molecules neutralise the organic acids (lactic acid and ketone bodies) produced in the muscles.

Pathology 
Some metabolic myopathies involve the under- or over-utilization of the Purine Nucleotide Cycle. Metabolic myopathies cause a low ATP reservoir in muscle cells (ADP > ATP),  resulting in exercise-induced excessive AMP buildup in muscle, and subsequent exercise-induced hyperuricemia (myogenic hyperuricemia) through conversion of excessive AMP into uric acid by way of either AMP → adenosine or AMP → IMP. 

During strenuous exercise, AMP is created through the use of the adenylate kinase (myokinase) reaction after the phosphagen system has been depleted of creatine phosphate and not enough ATP is being produced yet by other pathways (see above reaction in 'Occurrence' section). In those affected by metabolic myopathies, exercise that normally wouldn't be considered strenuous for healthy people, is however strenuous for them due to their low ATP reservoir in muscle cells. This results in regular use of the myokinase reaction for normal, everyday activities. 

Besides the myokinase reaction, a high ATP consumption and low ATP reservoir also increases protein catabolism, de novo synthesis and salvage of IMP, which results in increased AMP and IMP. These two nucleotides can then enter the Purine Nucleotide Cycle to produce fumarate which will then produce ATP by oxidative phosphorylation. If the Purine Nucleotide Cycle is blocked (such as AMP deaminase deficiency) or if exercise is stopped and increased fumarate production is no longer needed, then the excess nucleotides will be converted into uric acid.

AMP deaminase deficiency (MADD) 

AMP deaminase deficiency (formally known as myoadenylate deaminase deficiency or MADD) is a metabolic myopathy which results in excessive AMP buildup brought on by exercise. AMP deaminase is needed to convert AMP into IMP in the Purine Nucleotide Cycle. Without this enzyme, the excessive AMP buildup is initially due to the adenylate kinase (myokinase) reaction which occurs after a muscle contraction. However, AMP is also used to allosterically regulate the enzyme myophosphorylase (see Glycogen phosphorylase § Regulation), so the initial buildup of AMP triggers the enzyme myophosphorylase to release muscle glycogen into glucose-1-P (glycogen→glucose-1-P), which eventually depletes the muscle glycogen, which in turn triggers protein metabolism, which then produces even more AMP. In AMP deaminase deficiency, excess adenosine is converted into uric acid in the following reaction:

AMP → Adenosine → Inosine → Hypoxanthine → Xanthine → Uric Acid

Glycogenoses (GSDs) 

Myogenic hyperuricemia, as a result of the Purine Nucleotide Cycle running when ATP reservoirs in muscle cells are low (ADP > ATP), is a common pathophysiologic feature of glycogenoses such as GSD-III, GSD-V and GSD-VII, as they are metabolic myopathies which impair the ability of ATP (energy) production within muscle cells. In these metabolic myopathies, myogenic hyperuricemia is exercise-induced; inosine, hypoxanthine and uric acid increase in plasma after exercise and decrease over hours with rest. Excess AMP (adenosine monophosphate) is converted into uric acid. In GSD-VII (Tarui's disease, phosphofructokinase deficiency), besides a buildup of AMP from the myokinase reaction and the purine nucleotide cycle when the ATP reservoir is low (ADP>ATP), when the ATP reservoir returns to normal (ATP>ADP) then there is also excessive production of IMP (inosine monophosphate) due to the glycolytic block necessitating that glucose be catabolized down the pentose phosphate pathway which produces Ribose 5-P, which then converts to PRPP, which is further converted to produce IMP by de novo synthesis, a process that requires ATP (see Purine Metabolism).

AMP → IMP → Inosine → Hypoxanthine → Xanthine → Uric Acid

See also 

 AMP deaminase deficiency (MADD)
 Bioenergetic systems
 Glycogenoses (GSDs)
 Metabolic myopathies
 Phosphagen System (ATP-PCr)
 Protein catabolism
 Uric Acid § High uric acid

References

Metabolic pathways
Biochemistry